The 1916 United States Senate election in Ohio took place on November 7, 1916. Incumbent Democratic Senator Atlee Pomerene was re-elected to a second term in office over Republican former Governor and Ambassador to France Myron Herrick.

General election

Candidates
Jacob Coxey, businessman, advocate for the unemployed, and perennial candidate (Independent)
Myron Herrick, former U.S. Ambassador to France (1912–14) and Governor of Ohio (1904–06) (Republican)
Atlee Pomerene, incumbent Senator since 1911 (Democratic)
C. E. Ruthenberg (Socialist)
Aaron S. Watkins, former president of Asbury College (Prohibition)

Results

See also 
 1916 United States Senate elections

References

Ohio
1916
1916 Ohio elections